Ronaldo Antonio Dinolis Rodríguez (born 17 November 1994) is a Panamanian footballer in the position of striker, currently playing for Santa Fe.

Club career 
Dinolis began his football career in the second-division Panama club New York FC. In January 2017 he moved to the first-league Sporting San Miguelito . In Panameña League he made his debut on 14 January 2017 in a 3-0 defeat against Tauro, while the first goal in the top division was scored on 8 February in the same year in a 3-1 win against Atlético Veragüense . He immediately won a place in the starting lineup and quickly became the top scorer in the competition. In the autumn season Apertura 2017 was chosen in the official LPF plebiscite to the best eleven of the Panama league. He spent no more than a year and a half in Sporting, after which in June 2018 he moved to the Costa Rica team Santos de Guápiles.

International career 
Dinolis made his national team debut on 24 October 2017, scoring twice in their 5–0 friendly defeat to Grenada.

References

External links 

Living people
1994 births
Panamanian footballers
Panama international footballers
Panamanian expatriate footballers
Sporting San Miguelito players
Santos de Guápiles footballers
Unión Deportivo Universitario players
Real C.D. España players
C.D. Plaza Amador players
Liga Panameña de Fútbol players
Liga FPD players
Liga Nacional de Fútbol Profesional de Honduras players
Association football forwards
Panamanian expatriate sportspeople in Costa Rica
Panamanian expatriate sportspeople in Honduras
Expatriate footballers in Costa Rica
Expatriate footballers in Honduras